Zari Chah (also Romanized as Zarī Chāh) is a village in Dokuheh Rural District, Seh Qaleh District, Sarayan County, South Khorasan Province, Iran. At the 2006 census, its population was 91, in 28 families.

References 

Populated places in Sarayan County